Joan Lavender Bailie Guthrie or Laura Grey (1889–1914) was a British suffragette, and member of the Women's Social and Political Union (WSPU).

Life

Guthrie was born in 1889 in Caistor, Lincolnshire

Suffragist
Guthrie joined the WSPU at the age of 18. In 1912, she took part in a window-smashing raid, for which she was imprisoned in HM Prison Holloway. 

During her time in prison, she contributed to Holloway Jingles, a book of poetry which was published by the Glasgow branch of the WSPU. Her poem To D.R. is thought to be dedicated to fellow suffragette Dorothea Rock.

She took part in a hunger strike and was force fed. She received a hunger strike medal. It is thought that she developed an addiction to the barbiturate veronal, which eased the pain caused by the after effects of the force feeding.

Guthrie was given a Hunger Strike Medal 'for Valour' by WSPU.

Acting career
After her release from prison she worked as an actor. Her first stage performance was in the pantomime "The forty thieves" at the Lyceum Theatre in 1912

Death
Guthrie died at the age of 25, at 111 Jermyn Street, St James's, Westminster, leaving an estate valued at £1564. The cause of death was taking an overdose of veronal. A poem about her was published in the "Daily Herald" newspaper in June 1914. According to the website "Woman and her sphere", the poem was written by Anna Wickham.

References 

British feminists
Barbiturates-related deaths
English suffragettes
1889 births
1914 deaths
Scottish suffragists
People associated with Glasgow
Women's Social and Political Union
Hunger Strike Medal recipients
1914 suicides
Drug-related suicides in England
Suicides in Westminster